Plecoptera recta is a species of moth of the family Erebidae. It is found in Seram, Sulawesi, Southern India, Thailand, Peninsular Malaysia and Borneo.

The larvae feed on Dalbergia species.

External links
Moths of Borneo

Moths described in 1886
Moths of Asia